is a Japanese manga artist. Hosono was born in Ōta, Tokyo. In 1979, he made his debut with Crusher Joe while he was a student at Keio University. He has had stories published in the manga anthology series Petit Apple Pie.

Hosono is the author of Gallery Fake and Tarō as well, for which two he won Shogakukan Manga Award for general manga in 1996.

Works 
 Bio Hunter
 Crusher Joe
 Dirty Pair (uniform design for TV series and With Love from the Lovely Angels OVA episodes)
 Dokkiri Doctor
 
 Gallery Fake
 Taro
 Gu Gu Ganmo
 Judge
 Mama
 
 The Qwaser of Stigmata (episode 21 end illustration)
 Castle of Broadcast
 Devilman Gaiden -Ningen Senki-

References

External links 
 

 
1959 births
Living people
Manga artists from Tokyo
People from Ōta, Tokyo
Keio University alumni